Lin Yi-bing or Jason Lin ( Born: October 26, 1961 ) is a Taiwanese academic who has served as the Chair Professor of the Department of Computer Science and Information Engineering (CSIE) at National Chiao Tung University (NCTU) since 1995, and since 2002, the Chair Professor of the Department of Computer Science and Information Management (CSIM), at Providence University, a Catholic university in Taiwan. He also serves as Vice President of the National Chiao Tung University.

Brief biography
Lin entered the National Cheng Kung University in 1980 and graduated with a Bachelor of Science in Electrical Engineering (BSEE) in 1983. In 1985, he undertook a doctorate program at the University of Washington (Advisor: Ed Lazowska), and graduated with a Ph.D. in Computer Science in 1990. His research interests include personal communications, mobile computing, intelligent network signaling, computer telephony integration, and parallel simulation. He has developed an Internet of Things (IoT) platform called IoTtalk. This platform has been used for sustainable  applications including AgriTalk for intelligent agriculture, EduTalk for intelligent education, CampusTalk for intelligent university campus, and so on.

Career chronology
 1983 - 1985: Second Lieutenant Instructor, Communication and Electronics School of Chinese Army, Taiwan, R.O.C.
 1990 - 1995: Research Scientist, Applied Research Area, Bell Communications Research, Morristown, New Jersey
 1995 - 1996: TRB Review Committee Member for Telecommunication Laboratories (TL), Chunghwa Telecom Co., Ltd. 
 1995–present: Professor, Department of Computer Science and Information Engineering, National Chiao Tung University
 1996: Deputy Director, Microelectronics and Information Systems Research Center, (MIRC), NCTU
 1996 - 1997: Consultant, Computer & Communication Research Laboratories, Industrial Technology Research Institute (CCL/ITRI) 
 1997 - 1999: Chairman, Department of Computer Science and Information Engineering, National Chiao Tung University
 1999–present: Adjunct Research Fellow, Academia Sinica
 2002–present: Chair Professor, Department of Computer Science and Information  Management, Providence University, Shalu, Taiwan
 2004 - 2006: Dean, Office of Research and Development, National Chiao Tung University
 2006 - 2011: Dean, College of Computer Science, National Chiao Tung University
 Member of the International Advisory Board, Alpine Research and Development Lab for Networks and Telematics, University of Trento, Italy.
 2009–present: Member, Board of Directors, Chunghwa Telecommunications 
 2011–present: Vice President, National Chiao Tung University
 Source: Chiao Tung University webpage

Publications
Lin is the co-author of three books Wireless and Mobile Network Architecture (co-author with Imrich Chlamtac; published by John Wiley, 2001), Wireless and Mobile All-IP Networks (John Wiley, 2005), and Charging for Mobile All-IP Telecommunications (John Wiley, 2008).
Chiou, T., Tsai, S., & Lin, Y. (2014). Network security management with traffic pattern clustering. SOFT COMPUTING.
Yang, S., Lin, Y., Gan, C., Lin, Y., & Wu, C. (2014). Multi-link Mechanism for Heterogeneous Radio Networks. Wireless Personal Communications.
Lin, Y., Liou, R., Sung, Y. Coral, & Cheng, P. (2014). Performance Evaluation of LTE eSRVCC with Limited Access Transfers. IEEE Transactions on Wireless Communications.
Lin, P., & Lin, Y. (2014). An IP-Based Packet Test Environment for TD-LTE and LTE FDD. IEEE Communications Magazine.
Hung, H., Lin, Y., & Luo, C. (2014). Deriving the distributions for the numbers of short message arrivals. Wireless Communications and Mobile Computing.
Liou, R., Lin, Y., Chang, Y., Hung, H., Peng, N., & Chang, M. (2013). Deriving the Vehicle Speeds from a Mobile Telecommunications Network. IEEE Transactions on Intelligent Transportation Systems.
Lin, Y., Liou, R., Chen, Y., & Wu, Z. (2013). Automatic event-triggered call-forwarding mechanism for mobile phones. Wireless Communications and Mobile Computing.
Fu, H., Lin, P., & Lin, Y. (2013). Reducing Signaling Overhead for Femtocell/Macrocell Networks. IEEE Transactions on Mobile Computing.
Sanchez-Esguevillas, A., Carro, B., Camarillo, G., Lin, Y., Garcia-Martin, M. A., & Hanzo, L. (2013). IMS: The New Generation of Internet-Protocol-Based Multimedia Services. Proceedings of the IEEE.
Yang, S., Cheng, W., Hsu, Y., Gan, C., & Lin, Y. (2013). Charge scheduling of electric vehicles in highways. Mathematical and Computer Modeling.
Lin, Y., Huang-Fu, C., & Alrajeh, N. (2013). Predicting Human Movement Based on Telecom's Handoff in Mobile Networks. IEEE Transactions on Mobile Computing.
Lin, Y., Lin, P., Sung, Y. Coral, Chen, Y., Chen, W., Alrajeh, N., Lin, B. Paul, & Gan, C. (2013). Performance Measurements of TD-LTE, Wimax and 3G Systems. IEEE Wireless Communications.
Chuang, C., Lin, Y., & Ren, Z. Julie (2013). chapter preloading mechanism for e-reader in mobile environment. Information Sciences.
Yang, S., Wang, H., Gan, C., & Lin, Y. (2013). Mobile charging information management for smart grid networks. International Journal of Information Technology.
Liou, R., & Lin, Y. (2013). Mobility management with the central-based location area policy. Computer Networks.
鄭., Cheng, P., 林., 陳., Lin, Y., & Chen, R. (2013). 長期演進技術之加強單一無線語音通話連續性的限制通話轉移次數研究.
林., Lin, P., 林., 陳., Lin, Y., & Chen, W. (2013). 行動電信網路之IP封包量測.
劉., Liou, R., 林., & Lin, Y. (2013). LTE 移動管理及其對通話控制影響之研究.
羅., Luo, C., 林., 蘇., Lin, Y., & Sou, S. (2013). 簡訊傳送模型之研究.
吳., Wu, C., 林., & Lin, Y. (2013). 以多重無線存取技術強化高速列車無線傳輸之研究.

Awards
1997, 1999 and 2001 Distinguished Research Awards from National Science Council, ROC
1998 Outstanding Youth Electrical Engineer Award from CIEE, ROC
2003 IEEE Fellow
2003 ACM Fellow
2004 AAAS Fellow
2004 K.-T. Li Outstanding Award
2005 IET/IEE Fellow
2005 Pan WY Distinguished Research Award
2005 Teco Award
2005 Medal of Information, IICM  
2006 Best Impact Award, IEEE Taipei Section
2006 ISI Highly Cited Scholar (Author Publication Number: A0096-206-L)
2006 Academic Publication Award of The Sun Yat-Sen Cultural Foundation
2006 Academic Award of the Ministry of Education
2007 KT Hou Honored Award
2007 HP Technology for Teaching Higher Education Grant Award
2007 YZ Hsu Technology Cathedra Award
2008 Award for Outstanding contributions in Science and Technology, Executive Yuen, ROC.
2009 IBM Shared University Research Award
2010 IBM Faculty Award
2010 IEEE Region 10 Academia-Industry Partnership Award
2010 IEEE Vehicular Technology Society "Top Associate Editor"
2011 TWAS Prize in Engineering Sciences
2011 National Chair Award, Ministry of Education, ROC.

References

External links
Jason Yi-Bing Lin's home page.
 Yi-Bing Lin's blog

Academic staff of the National Chiao Tung University
Taiwanese computer scientists
Fellows of the Association for Computing Machinery
Living people
Fellow Members of the IEEE
TWAS laureates
Ministers of Science and Technology of the Republic of China
1961 births